Chopan railway station is the major railway station in the Sonbhadra district of Uttar Pradesh, India. It primarily serves Chopan town. Its code is CPU. The station consists of five platforms. The platforms are not well sheltered and the station lacks many facilities including drinking water and sanitation.

The station connects Sonbhadra district to major cities such as Jammu, Amritsar, Jalandhar, Ludhiana, Chandigarh, Delhi, Kanpur, Prayagraj, Varanasi, Lucknow, Bareilly, Pilibhit, Tanakpur, Dhanbad, Asansol, Howrah, Kolkata, Patna, Ranchi, Jamshedpur, Kharagpur, Sambalpur, Jabalpur, Bhopal, Ajmer and Ahmedabad.

Ranchi Rajdhani Express, Jharkhand Swarna Jayanti Express, Muri Express, Shaktipunj Express and Triveni Express are some popular trains halts at this station.

References 

Dhanbad railway division
Railway stations in Sonbhadra district